"Sittin' on Top of the World" is the lead single from Da Brat's second studio album Anuthatantrum.

Background
"Sittin' on Top of the World" was released in September 1996 and was produced and written by Jermaine Dupri, who used a sample of "Mary Jane". The song became her fourth consecutive top 40 hit in the United States, peaking at No. 30 on the Billboard Hot 100. About two months after its release, "Sittin' on Top of the World" reached gold status for sales of 500,000 copies on November 20, her third single to do so.

Music video
The music video was directed by Richard Murray and premiered on BET, MTV & VH1 in 1996.

Single track listing
"Sittin' on Top of the World" (Radio Edit)- 3:58
"Sittin' on Top of the World" (LP Version)- 4:17
"Sittin' on Top of the World" (Instrumental)- 4:17
"Sittin' on Top of the World" (Extended Radio Edit)- 5:09
"Sittin' on Top of the World" (Extended LP Version)- 5:09

Charts

Certifications

References

1996 singles
Da Brat songs
Song recordings produced by Jermaine Dupri
Songs written by Jermaine Dupri
Songs written by Da Brat
Songs written by Rick James
1996 songs
So So Def Recordings singles